X series or xSeries or Series-X or variation, may refer to:

 Nokia Xseries, a family of mobile phones.
 Sony X series
 Sony Ericsson X series, a series of cell phones
 Sony Vaio X series, a series of laptops
 Fujifilm X series, a series of digital cameras
 Yamaha's X-series motorcycles
 BMW X-series vehicles, see List of BMW vehicles
 IBM/Lenovo X series
 IBM System x, previously eServer xSeries
 ThinkPad X series, a series of laptops 
 Intel Core X-Series, a series of computer CPUs, under the Core brand from Intel
 X (video game series), a space combat and trading game series
 X the album, a series of Christian rock compilation albums
 X-Men (film series) (2000-2020, FOX), frequently called the "X" films, both X2 and X3 being so named
 Northgate SeriesX, a line of computers from Northgate Information Solutions
 Xbox Series X, 9th generation videogame console from Microsoft
 X-planes, a series of US experimental aircraft

See also

 W series (disambiguation)
 Y series (disambiguation)
 Series (disambiguation)
 X (disambiguation)